Although the majority of pirates in history have been men, there are around a hundred known examples of female pirates, about forty of whom were active in the Golden Age of Piracy. Some women have been pirate captains and some have commanded entire pirate fleets. Among the most powerful pirate women were figures such as Zheng Yi Sao (1775–1844) and Huang Bamei (1906–1982), both of whom led tens of thousands of pirates.

In addition to the few that were pirates themselves, women have also historically been more heavily involved in piracy through secondary roles, interacting with pirates through being smugglers, lenders of money, purchasers of stolen goods, tavern keepers and prostitutes, and through having been family members of both pirates and victims. Some women also married pirates and turned their homes or establishments into piratical safe havens. Through women in these secondary roles, pirates were strongly supported by the agency of women. Some influential women, including monarchs such as Elizabeth I of England, have also acted as powerful patrons of pirates. Although they have received little academic attention, women still occupy these important secondary roles in contemporary piracy. Piracy off the coast of Somalia is for instance supported to a large extent by on-shore women who participate in transportation, housing and recruitment.

Seafaring in general has historically been a highly masculine-gendered activity. Women who became pirates at times disguised themselves as men in order to do so since they were otherwise rarely allowed on pirate ships. On many ships in the Golden Age of Piracy, women were prohibited by the ship's contract (required to be signed by all crew members) due to being seen as bad luck and due to fears that the male crew members would fight over the women. Many famous female pirates, such as Anne Bonny (1697–?) and Mary Read (1685–1721), accordingly dressed and acted as men. Since the gender of many pirate women was only exposed after they were caught, it is possible that there were more women in piracy than is otherwise indicated by surviving sources.

In addition to historical female pirates, women in piracy have also frequently appeared in legends and folklore. The earliest legendary female pirate is perhaps Atalanta of Greek mythology, who according to legend joined the Argonauts in the years before the Trojan War. Scandinavian folklore and mythology, though the tales themselves are unverified, includes numerous female warriors (shield-maidens) who command ships and fleets. Female pirates have had varying roles in modern fiction, often reflecting cultural norms and traditions. Beginning in the 20th century, fictional pirate women have sometimes been romanticized as symbols of female liberty.

List of named female pirates

Ancient pirates

Vendel and Viking Age

Medieval and Renaissance pirates

Golden Age of Piracy

18th–19th centuries

20th century

Pirate women in fiction 

Fiction is often constrained by cultural structures and national fantasies of their time and historical fictional depictions of pirate women have accordingly reflected stereotypes concerning not only women but also women in power. Depictions of female pirates in A General History of the Pyrates (1724) for instance showcase a degree of unease. Illustrations in a Dutch 1725 edition of the book depict female pirates as unpleasant and bare-chested, trampling on figures representing justice and commerce. Pirate fiction grew increasingly popular in the mid-18th century and among the many tales written were novels starring female pirates. Several such narratives with women pirates and warriors were often highly formulaic, with the women going to sea or war in order to either win or regain the affection of a man. Some tales saw female pirates exceeding their male counterparts in courage, skill and virtue. Some works, such as Fanny Campbell, the Female Pirate Captain (1844), included great adventures but also ended with the central woman finding a man and settling down, perhaps an attempt to not conflict too much with traditional notions of femininty.

In the 20th century, fictional pirate women sometimes became symbols of feminism and female liberty; whereas male pirates were often used to tell stories of escape from wage slavery, female pirates illustrated escape from gender subordination. Such romanticization of pirates, whether male or female, is not grounded in history since pirates were typically violent criminals, thieves and murderers. An early work in this tradition is F. Tennyson Jesse's Moonraker (1927), wherein the pirate captain Lovel is revealed to be a woman with strong ideals on female liberty. Still, there also continued to be stories wherein women were seduced by pirates, such as the 1944 film Frenchman's Creek, and films wherein female pirates seduced men, such as Anne of the Indies (1951). Anne Providence, the main character of Anne of the Indies, was the first famous female pirate in film. 

The female pirate is sometimes cast as a feminist, or even an anarchist, icon. Ulrike Ottinger's 1978 film Madame X: An Absolute Ruler is about several women from different career backgrounds joining the pirate crew of "Madame X" above the Chinese ship Orlando and was inspired by the Chinese pirate women of the early 20th century. Among the various messages of the film were a critique of patriarchal and hierarchical power structures. The Pirates of the Caribbean film series includes several female pirates, most notably Elizabeth Swann. Although Swann is included in some stereotypical scenes and begins as a damsel in distress, she is turned into a courageous pirate and heroine over the course of the film series. Both Swann and the other female pirate Anamaria are depicted in Pirates of the Caribbean as cross-dressing, recalling real historical pirate women who did the same.

See also 

 Piracy
 Pirate code
 List of pirates
 Gender and crime
 Feminist school of criminology

Notes

References

Bibliography 

 
 
 
 
 
 
 
 
 
 
 
 
 
 
 
 
 
 
 
 
 
 
 
 
 
 
 
 
 
 
 
 
 
 
 
 
 
 
 
 
 
 
 
 
 
 
 
 
 
 
 

 
Piracy lists
Pirates
Pirates
Lists of women by occupation